Joseph Andrew Greenhalgh (born 9 January 1985) is an English cricketer.  Greenhalgh is a right-handed batsman who bowls right-arm off break.  He was born at Chesterfield, Derbyshire.

Greenhalgh represented the Derbyshire Cricket Board in a single List A match against Bedfordshire in the 1st round of the 2002 Cheltenham & Gloucester Trophy which was played in 2001.  In his only List A match, he scored a single run and took a single wicket at cost of 49 runs.

References

External links
Joe Greenhalgh at Cricinfo
Joe Greenhalgh at CricketArchive

1985 births
Living people
Cricketers from Chesterfield, Derbyshire
English cricketers
Derbyshire Cricket Board cricketers